Archbishop McHale College is a non-denominational vocational secondary school situated in Tuam, County Galway, Ireland. It is run by the Galway/Roscommon Education and Training Board. The school is named after Archbishop John McHale

Programmes 

Archbishop McHale College is participating in the Erasmus+ programme from 2016 to 2019. The school has exchanges with three schools in Ponteareas in Galicia in Spain. Students and staff from Ponteareas visited Tuam in May 2017.

References

Secondary schools in County Galway